Earshot is an American alternative metal band formed in Los Angeles in 1999. The band's lineup has changed several times during their existence, with vocalist Wil Martin being the band's sole constant member.

After signing to Warner Bros. Records, Earshot issued their debut album Letting Go (2002), which spawned the hit single "Get Away". The band's second album, Two (2004), also produced a hit single, "Wait". The band has since put out two more releases, The Silver Lining (2008), and the extended play Aftermath (2015).

History

Formation and Letting Go 
Earshot formed in 1999, with singer Wil Martin collaborating with guitarist Scott Kohler, bassist Guy Couturier, and drummer Todd Wyatt in L.A. Bassist Johnny Sprague and guitarist Mike Callahan joined the band shortly after their debut was completed. Singer-songwriter Wil has cited Led Zeppelin, The Beatles, Metallica, Thin Lizzy, U2, and Soundgarden as influences and inspirations. In 2001, the band signed with Warner Bros. Records. Earshot appeared with Alien Ant Farm, Adema, and Glassjaw during the SnoCore Rock Tour in early 2002.

Letting Go, Earshot's debut album, was released on May 7, 2002. It reached number 82 on the Billboard 200, and remained on the chart for five weeks. It featured their first single, "Get Away," which received significant radio airplay. The album's second single, "Not Afraid," was also released in 2002. The songs "Get Away", "We Fall, We Stand", and "Headstrong" were included in the 2002 video game Legends of Wrestling II for the PlayStation 2, GameCube, and Xbox. The song "Headstrong" was featured on the soundtrack for the film Queen of the Damned. The song "Ordinary Girl" was included in the 2003 video game Project Gotham Racing 2 for the Xbox. After months of touring with Staind, Kid Rock, and Stone Temple Pilots, "Get Away" peaked at No. 4 on the charts and stayed in the Top 100 for over 60 weeks. Earshot returned to the studio in 2003 after spending much of the previous year on the road. Despite its success, Warner Bros. never made a proper music video for the song. Producer David Kahne favoured "Ordinary Girl" as the album's second single, but Warner Bros. chose to release "Not Afraid" instead, which did not replicate the success of "Get Away".

Nearly two months after the album's release, Letting Go had shifted 47,000 copies, and by November 2002 the album had sold over 100,000 copies in the United States.

Two 
The band's second album, Two, was released on June 22, 2004. It charted at 127 on the Billboard 200 and remained on the chart for two weeks. It includes the breakthrough hit "Wait," which was included in the video games Madden NFL 2005 in 2004 and MX vs. ATV Unleashed in 2005. It was also featured in the DVD Tampa Bay Lightning 2004 Stanley Cup Champions. The album's second single, "Someone", was also released in 2004. The song "Down" was included in the video game Gretzky NHL 2005 in 2004. That year, the band opened for Megadeth.

The Silver Lining 
In early 2007, Earshot signed with Indegoot/Fontana/Universal Recordings, and began working on a new album, produced by Brian Garcia and co-produced by Wil Martin. Tracks on the album include "MisSunderstood," "Closer," "Where the Pain Begins," "Wasted," "Sometimes," "Don't Hate Me," and "Go". The band posted its new single, "MisSunderstood," on their MySpace page at 12AM (EST) on May 13, 2008. The official nationwide radio release date for the single was May 26, 2008. The Silver Lining was released on August 26, 2008.

The Ugly Truth (single) 
On October 20, 2009, the band released a free single through their website called "The Ugly Truth".

Aftermath (mini-LP) 
On May 7, 2014, Earshot released a new single, "Now That It's Over," from their five-song "Mini-LP" entitled Aftermath via iTunes, Amazon, as well as their official website. The second single, "Let Me," was released on June 24, 2014. The third single, "Remember," was released on September 8, 2014. Aftermath was released on April 16, 2015.

Recent events 
On May 14, 2020, Earshot released a cover of "Uninvited" by Alanis Morissette through all major digital platforms. It is still unclear if the band will release a new LP or EP.

On January 1, 2021, Earshot released "Been a Long Time" through all major digital platforms. On February 14, 2022, the band released "You + I" through all major digital platforms.

Discography

Studio albums

Extended plays

Singles

Music videos

Band members 
Current members

 Wil Martin – vocals (1999–2010, 2014–present)
 Andy Stafford – guitar (2020–present)
 John Novak – bass (2020–present)
 Mike Sylvia – drums (2020–present)
 Aaron Fink – guitar (2020–present)

Former members

 Guy Couturier – bass (1999–2000)
 Johnny Sprague – bass (2000–2005)
 Billy Blair – bass (2005–2009)
 "Rooster" – bass (2009–2010)
 Scott Kohler – guitar (1999–2009)

 Mike Callahan – guitar (1999–2005)
 Travis Arnold – guitar (2005–2009)
 Chris Loveless  – guitar (2009–2010)
 Josh Guinn  – guitar (2009–2010)
 Todd Wyatt – drums  (1999–2003)
 Chas Stumbo – drums (2003–2005)
 Darren Pfeifer – drums (2005–2010)

References

External links 

Official website

Musical quintets
Musical groups from Los Angeles
Musical groups established in 1999
Hard rock musical groups from California
Nu metal musical groups from California
1999 establishments in California
Heavy metal musical groups from California